Devils Slide State Forest is a  state forest in Stark, New Hampshire.

See also

List of New Hampshire state forests

References

External links
 U.S. Geological Survey Map at the U.S. Geological Survey Map Website. Retrieved January 5th, 2022.

New Hampshire state forests
Forests of New Hampshire
Nature reserves in New Hampshire
Protected areas of Coös County, New Hampshire